Prince Rahim Aga Khan (born 12 October 1971) is the second of the Aga Khan IV’s four children. Based in Geneva, Switzerland, he has been actively involved for many years in the governance of the Aga Khan Development Network (AKDN).

Early life and education 
Prince Rahim Aga Khan was born on 12 October 1971, in Geneva, the eldest son of Prince Karim Aga Khan and his first wife Princess Salimah Aga Khan.

Prince Rahim received his secondary education at Phillips Academy, Andover, Massachusetts (1990) and graduated from Brown University, Rhode Island, U.S. with a bachelor's degree in Comparative Literature awarded in 1995. In 2006, he completed an executive development program in management and administration at the University of Navarra IESE Business School in Barcelona, Spain. In 2010, he established the Aga Khan Brown Workshop series at the Watson Institute.

Career 
Prince Rahim has been actively involved in the governance of the Aga Khan Development Network (AKDN), where he currently chairs the AKDN Environment and Climate Committee and co-chairs AKDN's Budget Review Committees.

Prince Rahim sits on either the Board or Executive Committee for several of the AKDN's agencies and affiliated structures, namely the Aga Khan Fund for Economic Development, the Aga Khan University Foundation, the Aga Khan Foundation, the Aga Khan Development Network Foundation, the Aga Khan Agency for Microfinance and the Aga Khan Trust for Culture.

Prince Rahim travels regularly to oversee programs and other projects of the Aga Khan Development Network.

Personal life 
Prince Rahim married Kendra Irene Spears on 31 August 2013 in Geneva, Switzerland. They have two children: Prince Irfan (b. 11 April 2015) and Prince Sinan (b. 2 January 2017). The couple divorced in February 2022.

In 2019, he bought a house in Unstad, Vestvågøy, Norway.

References 

1971 births
Living people
Iranian Ismailis
Noorani family
Phillips Academy alumni
Brown University alumni
British people of Pakistani descent
British people of Iranian descent
British people of Italian descent
Pakistani Ismailis
British Ismailis
British people of Arab descent
People from Vestvågøy